Sparks the Rescue's Stumbling Skyward EP is the band's debut release, and only release without vocalist Alex Roy. Opening track "The Runaway Romance" was re-recorded and re-released for the 2007 EP, The Secrets We Can't Keep.

Track listing
All songs written by Sparks the Rescue.

"The Runaway Romance" – 3:28
"These Gray Skies" – 3:05
"Feet Of Angels" – 3:35
"You're Not Alone" – 2:49
"Psalm 39" – 3:54
"Distance From Regret" – 4:25
"Mob Scene" – 2:59

References 

2005 EPs
Sparks the Rescue EPs